"Forgiven" is a song recorded by Belgian vocal trance and europop group Sylver. It was released in October 2001 as the fifth and final single from their debut album, Chances. It reached the top 10 in Belgium and Romania.

Track listing
 "Forgiven" (Radio Edit Remixed) – 3:25
 "Forgiven" (Oliver Lieb Mix) – 8:28
 "Forgiven" (Club Caviar Mix) – 6:11
 "Forgiven" (Extended Mix) – 5:14

Charts

References

2001 songs
2001 singles
Sylver songs